East of Eden is a novel by American author and Nobel Prize winner John Steinbeck. Published in September 1952, the work is regarded by many to be Steinbeck's most ambitious novel and by Steinbeck himself to be his magnum opus. Steinbeck stated about East of Eden: "It has everything in it I have been able to learn about my craft or profession in all these years," and later said: "I think everything else I have written has been, in a sense, practice for this." The novel was originally addressed to Steinbeck's young sons, Thom and John (then 6 and 4 years old, respectively). Steinbeck wanted to describe the Salinas Valley for them in detail: the sights, sounds, smells and colors.

East of Eden brings to life the intricate details of two families, the Trasks and the Hamiltons, and their interwoven stories. The Hamilton family in the novel is said to be based on the real-life family of Samuel Hamilton, Steinbeck's maternal grandfather. A young John Steinbeck also appears briefly in the novel as a minor character.

Background
The story is primarily set in the Salinas Valley, California, between the beginning of the twentieth century and the end of World War I, though some chapters are set in Connecticut and Massachusetts, and the story goes as far back as the American Civil War.

In the beginning of East of Eden, before introducing his characters, Steinbeck carefully establishes the setting with a description of the Salinas Valley in Central California.

Plot
Samuel Hamilton is a warmhearted inventor and farmer.  He and his wife Liza, immigrants from Ireland, raise their nine children on a rough, infertile piece of land in the Salinas Valley. As the Hamilton children begin to grow up and leave home, a wealthy stranger, Adam Trask, purchases the best ranch in the Valley.

Adam's life is seen in a long, intricate flashback. We see his tumultuous childhood on a farm in Connecticut and the brutal treatment he endured from his younger but stronger half-brother, Charles. Adam and Charles's father, Cyrus, was a Union Civil War veteran who was wounded in his very first battle and unable (or perhaps unwilling) to return to service; he nonetheless becomes an expert "armchair general" who uses his intellectual knowledge of military affairs and wounded-veteran status to become a military adviser in Washington, D.C.

As a young man, Adam spent his time first in the military and then wandering the country. He was caught for vagrancy, escaped from a chain gang, and burgled a store for clothing to use as a disguise. Later, he wires Charles to request $100 to pay for his travels home. Adam later sends money to the store to pay for the clothes and damage. After Adam finally makes his way home to their farm, Charles reveals that Cyrus had died and left them an inheritance of $50,000 each. Charles is torn with fear that Cyrus did not come by the money honestly.

A parallel story introduces a girl named Cathy Ames, who grows up in a town not far from the brothers' family farm. Cathy is described as having a "malformed soul"; she is evil and delights in using and destroying people. She leaves home one evening after setting fire to her family's home, killing both of her parents. She becomes a whoremaster's mistress, but he beats her viciously upon realizing that she is using him and leaves her to die on Adam and Charles's doorstep. Charles sees through Cathy's facade, but Adam falls obsessively and irrationally in love and marries her. However, unbeknownst to Adam, Cathy seduces Charles at the time of her marriage and falls pregnant with twins, leaving open the question of whether Adam or Charles is the twins' father. She attempts and fails at a primitive abortion with a knitting needle. 

Adam – newly wed and newly rich – now arrives in California and settles with the pregnant Cathy in the Salinas Valley, near the Hamilton family ranch. Cathy neither wants to be a mother nor to stay in California. Though she warns Adam that she does not want to go to California and plans to leave as soon as she is able, Adam dismisses her, saying "Nonsense!" 

Cathy gives birth to twin boys and attempts to leave shortly after. Adam tries to lock her in the bedroom to stop her. She convinces him to open the door, shoots him in the shoulder, and flees. Adam recovers but falls into a deep depression. He is roused out of it enough to name and raise his sons with the help of his Cantonese servant, Lee, and Samuel, who helps Adam name the boys Aron and Caleb, after different characters in the Bible.

Lee becomes a good friend and adopted family member. Lee, Adam, and Samuel have long philosophical talks, particularly about the story of Cain and Abel, which Lee maintains has been incorrectly translated in English-language bibles. Lee tells about how his relatives in San Francisco, a group of Chinese scholars, spent two years studying Hebrew so that they might discover the moral of the Cain and Abel story. Their discovery that the Hebrew word timshel means "thou mayest" becomes an important symbol in the novel, meaning that mankind is neither compelled to pursue sainthood nor doomed to sin, but rather has the power to choose its path.

Meanwhile, Cathy has become a prostitute at the most respectable brothel in the city of Salinas. She renames herself "Kate Albey" and embarks on a devious – and successful – plan to ingratiate herself with the madam, murder her, and inherit the business. She makes her new brothel infamous as a den of sexual sadism.

Samuel finally dies of old age, but not before revealing his knowledge of Cathy's whereabouts. Hamilton is mourned by the entire town. After the funeral, Adam visits Kate at the brothel, to determine for himself that Hamilton's disclosure of Cathy's new life is true. Adam realizes that this woman who runs the brothel is indeed his wife.  Kate renounces him and the entire human race, and shows him pictures of the brothel's customers, all pillars of the community. Adam finally sees her for what she is and pities her, leaving Kate to hate him.

Adam's sons, Caleb ("Cal") and Aron – echoing Cain and Abel – grow up oblivious of their mother's situation. They are opposites: Aron is virtuous and dutiful, Cal wild and rebellious. At a very early age, Aron meets a girl, Abra Bacon, who is from a well-to-do family, and the two fall in love. Although there are rumors around town that Cal and Aron's mother is not dead but is actually still in Salinas, the boys do not yet know that she is Kate.

Inspired by Samuel's inventiveness, Adam starts an ill-fated business venture and loses almost all of the family fortune. The boys, particularly Aron, are horrified that their father is now the town laughingstock and are mocked by their peers for his failure.

As the boys reach the end of their school days, Cal decides to pursue a career in farming, and Aron goes to college to become an Episcopal priest. Cal, restless and tortured by guilt about his very human failings, shuns everyone around him and takes to wandering around town late at night. During one of these ramblings, he discovers that his mother is alive and the madam of a brothel. He goes to see her, and she spitefully tells him they are just alike. Cal replies that she is simply afraid and leaves.

Cal decides to "buy his father's love" by going into business with Samuel's son Will, who is now a successful automobile dealer. Cal's plan is to make his father's money back, capitalizing on World War I by selling beans grown in the Salinas Valley to nations in Europe for a considerable premium. He succeeds beyond his wildest expectations and wraps up a gift of $15,000 in cash which he plans to give to Adam at Thanksgiving.

Aron returns from Stanford University for the holiday. There is tension in the air, because Aron has not yet told their father that he intends to drop out of college. Rather than let Aron steal the moment, Cal gives Adam the money at dinner, expecting his father to be proud of him. Adam refuses to accept it, however, and tells Cal to give it back to the poor farmers he exploited.

Adam explains by saying,

In a fit of rage and jealousy, Cal takes Aron to see their mother, knowing it will be a shock to him. Sure enough, Aron immediately sees Kate for who she is and recoils from her in disgust. Wracked with self-hatred, Kate signs her estate over to Aron and commits suicide.

Aron, his idealistic worldview shattered, enlists in the Army to fight in World War I. He is killed in battle in the last year of the war, and Adam suffers a stroke upon hearing the news from Lee. Cal, who began a relationship with Aron's idealised girlfriend, Abra Bacon, after Aron went to war, tries to convince her to run away with him. She instead persuades him to return home.

Lee pleads with the bedridden and dying Adam to forgive his only remaining son. Adam responds by non-verbally indicating that he forgives Cal, and then says "timshel," giving Cal the choice to break the cycle and conquer sin.

Major themes
The book explores themes of depravity, beneficence, love, the struggle for acceptance and greatness, the capacity for self-destruction, and of guilt and freedom. It ties these themes together with references to and many parallels with the biblical Book of Genesis (especially  Genesis Chapter 4, the story of Cain and Abel).

Steinbeck's inspiration for the novel comes from the fourth chapter of Genesis, verses one through sixteen, which recounts the story of Cain and Abel. The title East of Eden was chosen by Steinbeck from Genesis, Chapter 4, verse 16: "And Cain went out from the presence of the Lord, and dwelt in the Land of Nod, on the east of Eden" (King James Version).

Other biblical parallels in the novel include:

In the novel, Adam, Samuel, and Lee have a significant conversation in which they realize that since Abel died before he had children, they themselves are the descendants of Cain.  However, this does not correspond to the text of Genesis, which states that contemporary humans are descended neither from Cain nor Abel, but from Adam and Eve's third son, Seth.

Characters 
 The Trask family: Cyrus Trask, Mrs. Trask, Alice, Adam, Charles, Aron, Caleb
 The Hamilton family: Samuel Hamilton, Liza, George, Will, Tom, Joe, Lizzie, Una, Dessie, Olive, Mollie
 Other characters: Cathy Ames, Lee, Abra Bacon, Mr. Edwards, Faye, Ethel, Joe Valery

Timshel 
Timshel is a major theme in the novel. However, there is no word timshel in Hebrew; Genesis 4:7 reads timshol, the second person singular masculine future indicative form of the verb moshel 'to rule', thus 'you shall/will rule'. In the novel itself, the use and meaning of timshel is explained by the character of Lee to mean "Thou mayest".

Daniel Levin explores the nuances of Steinbeck's use of the Hebrew word, investigating potential reasons for and implications of Steinbeck's error in translation.

Writing East of Eden 
As he wrote the novel, Steinbeck went through a number of possible titles for the book, including "The Salinas Valley", the working title from the beginning; "My Valley", after a Texas businessman suggested he make it more universal; "Down to the Valley"; and then, after he decided to incorporate the Biblical allusion directly into the title, "Cain Sign". It was only upon transcribing the 16 verses of Cain and Abel in the text itself that he enthusiastically took the last three words of the final verse, East of Eden:

"And Cain went out from the presence of the Lord and dwelt in the land of Nod on the east of Eden." (Genesis 4:16)

Steinbeck wrote to a friend after completing his manuscript, "I finished my book a week ago. [...] Much the longest and surely the most difficult work I have ever done... I have put all the things I have wanted to write all my life. This is 'the book.' If it is not good I have fooled myself all the time. I don't mean I will stop but this is a definite milestone and I feel released. Having done this I can do anything I want. Always I had this book waiting to be written."

Reception 
Upon its release in September 1952, the general reading public took East of Eden to its heart and quickly propelled it to the number one spot on the fiction best-seller list. In a letter to a friend, Steinbeck wrote "I am getting flocks of letters .... People write as though it were their book."

However, literary critics were not as gracious. The novel was not well received by critics, who found it heavy-handed and unconvincing, especially in its use of Biblical allusion. Many critics found the novel repulsive yet captivating due to its portrayal of violence and sexual sadism. In particular, critics found the character Cathy (and her brutality) to be wildly unbelievable and off-putting. Others found Steinbeck's philosophy to be too strong in the novel, and claimed that he was a moralist. According to critics, Steinbeck's portrayal of good and evil was both hyperbolic and oversimplified, especially in the character of Cathy.

Besides criticizing the major themes of the novel, others attacked his construction and narrative. For example, critics were perplexed at a lack of unity in the novel as Steinbeck attempted to incorporate the stories of two families. Many found the first-person narration distracting, as it appears inconsistently throughout the novel. Critics also disparaged the symbolism as obvious, the narrative as disorganized, and the characters as unrealistic.

These aspects are what the reading public loved. East of Eden became an instant bestseller in November 1952, a month after it was released, and is now considered one of Steinbeck's finest achievements. About 50,000 copies of the novel are sold each year. Its popularity skyrocketed once again in 2003 after being named Oprah's Book Club pick; it gained the top spot in the New York Times' Paperback Best Sellers list, and remains exceedingly popular with the general reading public.

Notes on the first edition
East of Eden was first published by Viking Press in September 1952. The first edition had two print runs: 1,500 copies were signed by Steinbeck; the second run was of unsigned copies. In both print runs, there is a spelling mistake on page 281, line 38: "I remember holding the bite of a line while Tom drove pegs and braided a splice." The word "bite" was mistakenly changed from the original word, "bight," during proofreading.

Adaptations
The book was adapted for cinema in the 1955 film East of Eden by director Elia Kazan, starring James Dean, Julie Harris, Richard Davalos, Raymond Massey, Jo Van Fleet, and Burl Ives. The movie deals only with the fourth and final part of the book; Dean acts the part of Adam's son Cal, while Davalos plays Aron, Cal's twin brother.
In 1981, ABC produced a miniseries adaptation of the novel. It aired in three installments and starred Karen Allen, Anne Baxter, Hart Bochner, Timothy Bottoms, Sam Bottoms, Bruce Boxleitner, Lloyd Bridges, Howard Duff, Warren Oates, Soon-Tek Oh, and Jane Seymour.
 In 1998, Australian theatre producer Rob Croser of Independent Theatre collaborated with Elaine Steinbeck in a stage production in Adelaide. 
From 2009 onwards, Universal Pictures has made various attempts to schedule production on another film adaptation based on the novel. Previously, one version separate from Universal's version was attempted, with Ron Howard and Paul Attanasio attached. The first attempt under Universal would have been with Tom Hooper directing from a screenplay written by Christopher Hampton, around 2009. In 2013, Gary Ross became attached to the project as writer and director, with Jennifer Lawrence being cast in the role of Cathy Ames shortly thereafter. In April 2014, Ross said that the film will be split into two.
 Netflix is adapting the novel into a limited series, with Zoe Kazan writing and executive producing and Florence Pugh attached to star and co-produce.

References
Notes

Further reading
Govoni, Mark W. "Symbols for the Wordlessness': The Original Manuscript of East of Eden." Steinbeck Quarterly 14.01-02 (Winter/Spring 1981): 14-23
McDaniel, Barbara. "Alienation in East of Eden: 'The Chart of the Soul'. Steinbeck Quarterly 14.01-02 (Winter/Spring 1981): 32-39

External links

 

1952 American novels
History of Monterey County, California
Novels by John Steinbeck
Novels about American prostitution
Novels set in California
American novels adapted into films
American novels adapted into television shows
Family saga novels
Viking Press books
Patricide in fiction
Matricide in fiction
Works based on the Old Testament